Khay Ma Ne was the chief queen of King Tabinshwehti of Toungoo Dynasty from 1545 to 1550. The ethnic Mon queen was an adopted daughter of wealthy woman in Pegu (Bago), who had found her as a young child in the field by her cattle.

References

Bibliography
 
 

Chief queens consort of Toungoo dynasty
16th-century Burmese women